Dmitry Aleksandrovich Muserskiy (born 29 October 1988) is a Russian volleyball player of Ukrainian descent, member of the Russian national team and Japanese club, Suntory Sunbirds. 2012 Olympic Champion, 2011 World Cup winner, 2013 European Champion, and multiple World League medallist. Muserskiy is among the world's tallest athletes.

Career
Muserskiy began playing volleyball at the age of 8 under the guidance of Boris Osnach. In 2006 Muserskiy defended the colors of the junior national team. On 4 June 2010 in Yekaterinburg, in his first match for the Russian national team against USA in the FIVB World League Muserskiy scored 13 points and became the best scorer of the Russian team that day. In 2011, with his national team, he won the FIVB World League and the FIVB World Cup.

Personal life
Muserskiy was born in Makiivka, Ukraine, Soviet Union. He gained Russian citizenship in 2006. In February 2015, his wife gave birth to their son, Roman.

Sporting achievements

Clubs
 CEV Champions League
  2013/2014 – with Belogorie Belgorod

 FIVB Club World Championship
  Belo Horizonte 2014 – with Belogorie Belgorod

 CEV Cup
  2008/2009 – with Belogorie Belgorod
  2017/2018 – with Belogorie Belgorod

 National championships
 2012/2013  Russian Cup, with Belogorie Belgorod
 2012/2013  Russian Championship, with Belogorie Belgorod
 2013/2014  Russian SuperCup, with Belogorie Belgorod
 2013/2014  Russian Cup, with Belogorie Belgorod
 2014/2015  Russian SuperCup, with Belogorie Belgorod
 2020/2021  Japanese Championship, with Suntory Sunbirds
 2021/2022  Japanese Championship, with Suntory Sunbirds

Individual awards
 2010: FIVB World League – Best Blocker
 2011: FIVB World League – Best Server
 2013: FIVB World League – Best Middle Blocker
 2013: CEV European Championship – Most Valuable Player
 2013: FIVB World Grand Champions Cup – Most Valuable Player
 2014: CEV Champions League – Best Middle Blocker
 2014: FIVB Club World Championship – Most Valuable Player
 2018: FIVB Nations League – Best Middle Blocker

References

External links

 
 
 
 Player profile at Volleybox.net

1988 births
Living people
Ukrainian emigrants to Russia
Naturalised citizens of Russia
Russian people of Ukrainian descent
Sportspeople from Makiivka
Russian men's volleyball players
Olympic gold medalists for Russia
Olympic medalists in volleyball
Olympic volleyball players of Russia
Volleyball players at the 2012 Summer Olympics
Medalists at the 2012 Summer Olympics
VC Yurydychna Akademiya Kharkiv players
VC Belogorie players
Middle blockers